Nebraska Orthopaedic Hospital is the Omaha, Nebraska region's first hospital dedicated to the complete care and treatment of orthopaedic patients. The hospital is licensed as an acute care hospital by the State of Nebraska and fully accredited by The Joint Commission. OrthoNebraska's legal name is Nebraska Orthopaedic Hospital, LLC. OrthoNebraska has also obtained Disease Specific Care Certification by the Joint Commission for both total hip and total knee replacement—the only hospital in Nebraska to hold this level of certification. The hospital is also certified by the Centers for Medicare and Medicaid Services (CMS), and is therefore able to provide care for individuals who participate in those government sponsored programs.

The hospital has twice been recognized as a top orthopaedic provider by U.S. News & World Report. In 2011, Nebraska Orthopaedic Hospital was recognized as the 38th-best hospital in the nation for orthopaedic care, and #1 in the Omaha/Council Bluffs metro region.

Nebraska Orthopaedic Hospital was named one of America's 100 Best for Joint Replacement, and received the Patient Safety Excellence Award and Outstanding Patient Experience Award by Healthgrades, in 2015. The hospital ranked 61st out of 3,575 hospitals in Medicare's Value-Based Purchasing Program.

History 

Nebraska Orthopaedic Hospital opened in April 2004 under the ownership of several practicing orthopaedic surgeons and Nebraska Medicine. In 2017, Nebraska Orthopaedic Hospital and Orthowest, an orthopedic practice, joined together as OrthoNebraska.

Facility & Services 

The hospital is equipped with 24 private inpatient rooms, 7 extended recovery rooms, 12 surgical suites, and 10 Emergency Department bays. The hospital has utilized an electronic medical record since it opened in April 2004.

Nebraska Orthopaedic Hospital specializes in the diagnostic, surgical and rehabilitative needs of persons with musculoskeletal conditions. Services include:

 Inpatient/Outpatient orthopedic surgery and Neurosurgery
 Non-Orthopaedic outpatient surgery
 Pain management
 Physical and occupational therapy
 Spine Care
 Diagnostic imaging (MRI, CT, and X-ray)
 Emergency services
 Pharmacy
 Sports medicine
 Workers' compensation

Ownership 

Nebraska Orthopaedic Hospital is a unique partnership developed between practicing orthopaedic surgeons and the private investment. The hospital meets the definition of a "physician-owned hospital" under 42 CFR 489.3.

The Joint Commission 

In 2007, Nebraska Orthopaedic Hospital received full accreditation from The Joint Commission. In addition, in 2010 the hospital sought and received disease specific certification from The Joint Commission for Total Hip and Total Knee replacement.

The Joint Commission is the premier credentialing and accrediting organization within health care. Earning the Gold Seal for full accreditation from The Joint Commission means that the hospital meets the highest standards for patient care.

References

Hospital buildings completed in 2004
2004 establishments in Nebraska
Hospitals established in 2004
Hospitals in Omaha, Nebraska
Hospitals in Nebraska